Poecilipta is a genus of South Pacific corinnid sac spiders first described by Eugène Simon in 1897.

Species
 it contains twenty-seven species in Australia, and one on New Caledonia:
Poecilipta carnarvon Raven, 2015 – Australia (Western Australia)
Poecilipta contorqua Raven, 2015 – Australia (New South Wales)
Poecilipta davidi Raven, 2015 – Australia (South Australia)
Poecilipta elvis Raven, 2015 – Australia (Western Australia)
Poecilipta formiciforme (Rainbow, 1904) – Australia (New South Wales)
Poecilipta gloverae Raven, 2015 – Australia (Queensland)
Poecilipta harveyi Raven, 2015 – Australia (Western Australia)
Poecilipta janthina Simon, 1896 (type) – Australia (Queensland)
Poecilipta jilbadji Raven, 2015 – Australia (Western Australia)
Poecilipta kgari Raven, 2015 – Australia (Queensland)
Poecilipta kohouti Raven, 2015 – Australia (Northern Territory, South Australia, Queensland, New South Wales)
Poecilipta lugubris Raven, 2015 – Australia (New South Wales, Australian Capital Territory)
Poecilipta mandjelia Raven, 2015 – New Caledonia
Poecilipta marengo Raven, 2015 – Australia (New South Wales)
Poecilipta metallica Raven, 2015 – Australia (Queensland)
Poecilipta micaelae Raven, 2015 – Australia (New South Wales)
Poecilipta qunats Raven, 2015 – Australia (Queensland)
Poecilipta rawlinsonae Raven, 2015 – Australia (Western Australia)
Poecilipta ruthae Santana & Raven, 2015 – Australia (Queensland)
Poecilipta samueli Raven, 2015 – Australia (Queensland)
Poecilipta smaragdinea (Simon, 1909) – Australia (Western Australia)
Poecilipta tinda Raven, 2015 – Australia (South Australia)
Poecilipta venusta Rainbow, 1904 – Australia (Queensland to Victoria, South Australia)
Poecilipta waldockae Raven, 2015 – Australia (Western Australia)
Poecilipta wallacei Raven, 2015 – Australia (Western Australia to Queensland)
Poecilipta yambuna Raven, 2015 – Australia (Victoria)
Poecilipta zbigniewi Raven, 2015 – Australia (Tasmania)

References

Araneomorphae genera
Corinnidae
Spiders of Australia
Taxa named by Eugène Simon